Ernie Ewert, Jr. (born 5 June 1954) is a former professional tennis player from Australia.

Biography
Born in Melbourne in 1954, Ewert Jr was the son of a butcher, Ernie Ewert Sr, who went on to become a successful horse trainer.

Beginning on the professional circuit at the end of 1971, Ewert was coached by seven-time grand slam champion Mervyn Rose. During his career he competed in the main draw of all four grand slam tournaments. At the 1973 Wimbledon Championships he made the third round, with wins over Konstantin Pugaev and Mike Machette. As a doubles player he reached two grand slam quarter-finals, in the mixed doubles at the 1975 Wimbledon Championships with Mimmi Wikstedt and in the men's doubles partnering Brad Guan at the 1980 Australian Open.

Ewert took up his father's profession after his tennis career, working as a horse trainer.

Challenger titles

Doubles: (4)

References

External links
 
 

1954 births
Living people
Australian male tennis players
Tennis players from Melbourne
20th-century Australian people
21st-century Australian people